The 3rd Infantry Division (3ID) (nicknamed Rock of the Marne) is a combined arms division of the United States Army based at Fort Stewart, Georgia. It is a direct subordinate unit of the XVIII Airborne Corps and U.S. Army Forces Command. Its current organization includes a division headquarters and headquarters battalion, two armored brigade combat teams, one National Guard infantry brigade combat team, one task force battalion, one aviation brigade, a division artillery, a sustainment brigade and a combat sustainment support battalion along with a maneuver enhancement brigade. The division has a distinguished history, having seen active service in World War I, World War II, the Korean War, and the Global War on Terror. The Medal of Honor has been awarded to 61 members of the 3rd Infantry Division, making the division the most honored in the Army.

The division fought in France in World War I. In World War II, it landed with General Patton's task force in a contested amphibious landing on the coast of Morocco, North Africa, overwhelming Vichy French defenders in November 1942. In 1943, the division invaded Sicily in July, and invaded Italy at Salerno in September, before fighting in France and finally Germany. Medal of Honor recipient Audie Murphy, featured in the Hollywood movie, "To Hell and Back," was a member. The division also served in the Korean War. From 1957 until 1996, the division was a major part of the United States Army's presence in the NATO alliance in West Germany.

History

World War I

The 3rd Division was activated on 21 November 1917, seven months after the American entry into World War I, at Camp Greene, North Carolina. Eight months later, it saw combat for the first time in France on the Western Front.

Order of battle
Headquarters, 3rd Division
5th Infantry Brigade
4th Infantry Regiment
7th Infantry Regiment
8th Machine Gun Battalion
6th Infantry Brigade
30th Infantry Regiment
38th Infantry Regiment
9th Machine Gun Battalion
3rd Field Artillery Brigade
10th Field Artillery Regiment (75 mm)
18th Field Artillery Regiment (155 mm)
76th Field Artillery Regiment (75 mm)
3rd Trench Mortar Battery
6th Engineer Regiment
5th Field Signal Battalion
Headquarters Troop, 3rd Division
3rd Train Headquarters and Military Police
3rd Ammunition Train
3rd Supply Train
3rd Engineer Train
3rd Sanitary Train
5th, 7th, 26th, and 27th Ambulance Companies and Field Hospitals

At midnight on 14 July 1918, the division earned a lasting distinction. Engaged in the Aisne-Marne Offensive as a member of the American Expeditionary Force (AEF) to Europe, the division was protecting the French capital of Paris with a position on the banks of the Marne River. The 8th Machine Gun Battalion of the 3rd Division rushed to Château-Thierry amid retreating French troops and held the Germans back at the Marne River. While surrounding units retreated, the 3rd Division, including the 4th, 30th, and 38th Infantry Regiments, remained steadfast throughout the Second Battle of the Marne, and Colonel Ulysses G. McAlexander's dogged defense earned the 38th Infantry Regiment its nickname as the "Rock of the Marne". During the massive attack, the 3rd Infantry Division's commanding officer, Major General Joseph T. Dickman, famously cried out "Nous Resterons La" (We Shall Remain Here). Their Blue and White insignia also earned them the nickname The Blue and White Devils." The rest of the division was absorbed under French command until brought back together under the command of Major General Joseph T. Dickman and by 15 July 1918 they took the brunt of what was to be the last German offensive of the war. General John Joseph "Black Jack" Pershing, Commander-in-chief of the AEF on the Western Front, called this stand "one of the most brilliant pages in the annals of military history". During the war, two members of the division were awarded the Medal of Honor.

Casualties during the war were 3,177 killed in action with 12,940 wounded.

Commanders
 MG Joseph T. Dickman (28 November 1917)
 BG James A. Irons (11 February 1918)
 MG Joseph T. Dickman (13 February 1918)
 BG James A. Irons (27 February 1918)
 BG Charles Crawford (8 March 1918)
 BG James A. Irons (10 March 1918)
 BG Charles Crawford (19 March 1918)
 MG Joseph T. Dickman (12 April 1918)
 BG Fred W. Sladen (18 August 1918)
 MG Beaumont B. Buck (27 August 1918)
 BG Preston Brown (18 October 1918)
 MG Robert Lee Howze (19 November 1918)

Interwar years
In August 1919 the Third Infantry Division returned from France and was stationed at Camp Pike in Arkansas. The division remained at Camp Pike until 1921, when it was relocated to Camp Lewis in Washington state.

Commanders:

BG William Mackey Cruikshank (Aug 1919)
BG Ora Elmer Hunt  (Aug 1919–Oct 1919)
MG William M. Wright (Oct 1919–Jan 1920)
BG Edward Mann Lewis (Jan 1920–Aug 1921)
MG Charles Henry Muir (Aug 1921–Nov 1922)
BG Ulysses G. McAlexander (Nov 1922–Nov 1923)	
MG Edwin B. Babbitt (Nov 1923–May 1924)
BG Joseph E. Kuhn (May 1924–Dec 1924
MG William H. Johnston (Dec 1924–Oct 1925)
MG Robert Alexander (Oct 1925–Aug 1927)
MG Joseph D. Leitch (Sep 1927–Mar 1928)
BG Michael J. Lenihan (Mar 1928–Mar 1929)
BG Joseph Compton Castner (Apr 1929–Nov 1932)
BG Halstead Dorey (1932–1933)
BG Henry W. Butner (1933–Feb 1934)
BG Otho B. Rosenbaum (Feb 1934–Aug 1935)
MG Casper H. Conrad Jr. (Aug 1935–Aug 1936)
MG David L. Stone (Sep 1936–Mar 1937)
BG Alfred T. Smith (Jul 1937–Jan 1938)
MG Walter C. Sweeney Sr. (1939–1940)

World War II

Order of battle
Headquarters, 3rd Infantry Division
7th Infantry Regiment
15th Infantry Regiment
30th Infantry Regiment
Headquarters and Headquarters Battery, 3rd Infantry Division Artillery
9th Field Artillery Battalion (155 mm)
10th Field Artillery Battalion (105 mm)
39th Field Artillery Battalion (105 mm)
41st Field Artillery Battalion (105 mm)
10th Engineer Combat Battalion
3rd Medical Battalion
3rd Cavalry Reconnaissance Troop, Mechanized
Headquarters, Special Troops, 3rd Infantry Division
Headquarters Company, 3rd Infantry Division
703rd Ordnance Light Maintenance Company
3rd Quartermaster Company
3rd Signal Company
Military Police Platoon
Band
3rd Counterintelligence Corps Detachment

Combat chronicle 

The 3rd Division is the only division of the U.S. Army during World War II that fought the Axis on all European fronts, and was among the first American combat units to engage in offensive ground combat operations. Audie Murphy, the most highly decorated American soldier of the war, served with the 3rd Division. The 3rd Infantry Division also had a German Shepherd-Collie-Huskey mix war dog named Chips from Pleasantville, New York given to them by the Dogs for Defence program. The 3rd Infantry Division saw combat in North Africa, Sicily, Italy, France, Germany and Austria for 531 consecutive days. During the war the 3rd Infantry Division consisted of the 7th, 15th and 30th Infantry Regiments, together with supporting units.

The 3rd Division, under the command of Major General Jonathan W. Anderson, after spending many months training in the United States after the Japanese attack on Pearl Harbor, first saw action during the war as a part of the Western Task Force in Operation Torch, the Allied invasion of North Africa, landing at Fedala on 8 November 1942, and captured half of French Morocco. The division remained there for the next few months and therefore took no part in the Tunisian Campaign, which came to an end in May 1943 with the surrender of almost 250,000 Axis soldiers who subsequently became prisoners of war (POWs). While there a battalion of the 30th Infantry Regiment acted as security guards during the Casablanca Conference in mid-January 1943 with Chips as one of the guard dogs. Some soldiers say that Chips sniffed out a time bomb set up by enemy saboteurs before the conference took place and saved lives. In late February Major General Anderson left the division and was replaced by Major General Lucian K. Truscott, Jr., who instituted a tough training regime and ensured that all ranks in the division could march five miles in one hour, and four miles an hour thereafter. The troops called it "the Truscott Trot". The division began intensive training in amphibious landing operations.

On 10 July 1943, the division made another amphibious assault landing on the Italian island of Sicily (codenamed Operation Husky), landing at Licata town on the beach, to west, called Torre di Gaffi and Mollarella and on the beach, to east, called Falconara. During the invasion a platoon of soldiers from the 30th Infantry Regiment, accompanied with Chips, moved inland into the Sicilian countryside when they got ambushed by Italian mortar and machine gun fire. Cut off from the rest of the regiment by Italian skirmishes and the field telephone line cut from the bombardment, the platoon fought hard until Chips, ordered by his handler Pvt. John P. Rowell, ran back HQ with a phone line to restore communication while dodging enemy fire. Chips ran through enemy fire again back to his handler and the platoon received word that the reinforcements were on their way. Another Italian machine gun team made their way around the rear of the platoon and opened fire. The platoon leader sent a lone American soldier to take out the MG nest but when he was pinned down, Chips broke free from his handler and ran toward the MG nest, jumped in and attacked the Italian soldiers manning the gun. Pvt. Rowell and the other soldier ran to help Chips and the gunners were forced to surrender. Chips only sustained a scalp wound and gunpowder burns from the explosions. The division, serving under the command of Lieutenant General George S. Patton's U.S. Seventh Army, fought its way into Palermo before elements of the 2nd Armored Division could get there, in the process marching 90 miles in three days, and raced on to capture Messina on 17 August, thus ending the brief Sicilian campaign, where the division had a short rest to absorb replacements. During the campaign the 3rd Division gained a reputation as one of the best divisions in the Seventh Army.

Eight days after the Allied invasion of mainland Italy, on 18 September 1943, the 3rd Division came ashore at Salerno, where they came under the command of VI Corps, under Major General Ernest J. Dawley who was replaced two days later by Major General John P. Lucas (who had commanded the division from September 1941 to March 1942). The corps was part of Lieutenant General Mark W. Clark's U.S. Fifth Army. The 3rd Division was destined to see some of the fiercest and toughest fighting of the war thus far, serving on the Italian Front. Seeing intensive action along the way, the division drove to and across the Volturno River by October 1943, and then to Monte Cassino, where the Battle of Monte Cassino would later be fought, before, with the rest of the 15th Army Group, being held up at the Winter Line (also known as the Gustav Line). In mid-November the division, after spearheading the Fifth Army's advance and suffering heavy casualties during the past few weeks, was relieved by the 36th Infantry Division and pulled out of the line to rest and absorb replacements, coming under the command of Major General Geoffrey Keyes' II Corps. The division remained out of action until late December.

After a brief rest, the division was part of the amphibious landing at Anzio, codenamed Operation Shingle, on 22 January 1944, still as part of VI Corps, and serving alongside the British 1st Infantry Division and other units. It would remain there for just over four months in a toe-hold against numerous furious German counterattacks, and enduring trench warfare similar to that suffered on the Western Front during World War I. On 29 February 1944, the 3rd Division fought off an attack by three German divisions, who fell back with heavy losses two days later. In a single day of combat at Anzio, the 3rd Infantry Division suffered more than 900 casualties, the most of any American division on one day in World War II. The division's former commander, Major General Lucas, was replaced as commander of VI Corps by the 3rd Division's commander, Major General Truscott. He was replaced in command of the 3rd Division by Brigadier General John W. "Iron Mike" O'Daniel, previously the assistant division commander (ADC) and a distinguished World War I veteran.

In late May, VI Corps broke out of the Anzio beachhead in Operation Diadem with the 3rd Division in the main thrust. Instead of defeating the Germans, Lieutenant General Clark, the Fifth Army commander, disobeying orders from General Sir Harold Alexander, Commander-in-Chief (C-in-C) of the Allied Armies in Italy (formerly the 15th Army Group), sent the division on to the Italian capital of Rome. This allowed the majority of the German 10th Army, which would otherwise have been trapped, to escape, thus prolonging the campaign in Italy. The division was then removed from the front line and went into training for the Operation Dragoon, the Allied invasion of Southern France.

On 15 August 1944, D-Day for Dragoon, the division, still under VI Corps command but now under the U.S. Seventh Army, landed at St. Tropez, advanced up the Rhone Valley, through the Vosges Mountains, and reached the Rhine at Strasbourg, 26–27 November 1944. After maintaining defensive positions it took part in clearing the Colmar Pocket on 23 January, and on 15 March struck against Siegfried Line positions south of Zweibrücken. The division advanced through the defenses and crossed the Rhine, 26 March 1945; then drove on to take Nuremberg in a fierce battle, capturing the city in block-by-block fighting, 17–20 April. The 3rd pushed on to take Augsburg where it liberated thousands of forced laborers from the Augsburg concentration camp, a force labor subcamp of Dauchau, and Munich, 27–30 April, and was in the vicinity of Salzburg when the war in Europe ended. Elements of the 7th Infantry Regiment serving under the 3rd Infantry Division captured Hitler's retreat near Berchtesgaden.

Casualties
Total battle casualties: 25,977
Killed in action: 4,922
Wounded in action: 18,766
Missing in action: 554
Prisoner of war: 1,735

Commanders
 MG Charles F. Thompson (July 1940 – August 1941)
 BG Charles P. Hall (August 1941 – September 1941)
 MG John P. Lucas (September 1941 – March 1942)
 MG Jonathan W. Anderson (March 1942 – March 1943)
 MG Lucian K. Truscott Jr. (March 1943 – February 1944)
 MG John W. O'Daniel (February 1944 – December 1945)
 MG William R. Schmidt (July 1945 – August 1946)

Korean War
Commanders:
 MG Robert H. Soule (August 1950 – October 1951)
 MG Thomas J. Cross (October 1951 – May 1952)
 MG Robert L. Dulaney (May 1952 – October 1952)
 MG George W. Smythe (October 1952 – May 1953)
 MG Eugene W. Ridings (May 1953 – October 1953)

During the Korean War, the division was known as the "Fire Brigade" for its rapid response to crisis. 3rd Infantry Division had been headquartered at Fort Benning along with its 15th Infantry Regiment. The 7th Infantry Regiment was located at Fort Devens. 3rd Infantry Division initially arrived in Japan where, as the Far East Command Reserve, it planned post conflict occupation missions in northern Korea. In Japan their strength was increased by augmentation by South Korean soldiers. The division was assigned to X Corps and landed at Wonsan on the east coast of Korea on 5 November and received the 65th Infantry Regiment as their third maneuver element before moving north to Hungnam and Majon-dong. At Majon-dong they established a defensive position with the 65th Infantry. 1st and 2nd Battalions of the 7th Infantry were on the left flank. The 15th Infantry was between the 7th and 65th Regiments. 3rd Battalion, 7th Infantry was set as the nucleus for Task Force Dog which was commanded by Brigadier General Armistead D. Mead, assistant 3rd Division commander and sent north to conduct a relief in place with 1st Battalion, 1st Marine Regiment at Chinhung-ni; the south end of the 1st Marine Division and support the withdrawal of 1st Marine Division and Regimental Combat Team 31 from the fighting at the Chosin Reservoir. 3rd Infantry Division's Task Force Dog was the rearguard keeping the pressure off of the Marine column. The division along with the 7th Infantry Division established a collapsing perimeter around the port of Hungnam until the last of X Corps was evacuated. The division was the last unit to leave Hungnam and was shipped to Pusan where it completed unloading on 30 December and moved north to Kyongju and on 31 December it was placed in Eighth Army reserve for reorganization and reequipping following which it was to move into the Pyongtaek-Ansong area. The division was then transferred to US I Corps.

In January 1953 the division was transferred from I Corps. The division served in Korea until 1953 when it was withdrawn. Notably, the division fought at the Chorwon-Kumwha area, Jackson Heights and Arrowhead outposts and blocked a push in the Kumsong Area in July 1953.

3rd Infantry Division received ten Battle Stars. Eleven more members of the unit received Medals of Honor during the Korean War. Eight were from the 7th Infantry Regiment: Jerry K. Crump (6 and 7 September 1951), John Essebagger, Jr. (25 April 1951), Charles L. Gilliland (25 April 1951), Clair Goodblood (24 and 25 April 1951), Noah O. Knight (23 and 24 November 1951), Darwin K. Kyle (16 February 1951), Leroy A. Mendonca (4 July 1951), and Hiroshi H. Miyamura, whose award was classified Top Secret until his repatriation (24 and 25 April 1951). Three more recipients were with the 15th Infantry Regiment: Emory L. Bennett (24 June 1951), Ola L. Mize (10 and 11 June 1953) and Charles F. Pendleton (16 and 17 July 1953).

During the Korean War, the division had 2,160 killed in action and 7,939 wounded.

After the armistice, the division remained in Korea until 1954, when it was reduced to near zero strength, the colors were transferred to Fort Benning, Georgia and, in December 1954, the 47th Infantry Division was reflagged as the Third.  

On 1 July 1957, the division was reorganized as a Pentomic Division. The division's three infantry regiments (the 7th, 15th and 30th) were inactivated, with their elements reorganized into five infantry battle groups (the 1-7 IN, 1-15 IN, 1-30 IN, 2-38 IN and the 2-4 IN). 
In April 1958, the division deployed to Germany as part of an Operation Gyroscope rotation (soldiers and families, no equipment), switching places with the 10th Infantry Division (which was reflagged as the 2nd Infantry Division upon its arrival at Fort Benning). 
In 1963, the division was reorganized as a Reorganization Objective Army Division (ROAD). Three Brigade Headquarters were activated and Infantry units were reorganized into battalions.

Cold War to the Millennium (1953 through 2000)

The division was stationed with the V Corps (1958–63, 1992-1996) and VII Corps (1963–92) in West Germany from near the Czech border westward throughout various towns including Würzburg (Div. Hq. & Support Command), Schweinfurt (1st Brigade), Kitzingen (2nd Brigade), and Aschaffenburg (3rd Brigade). In August 1961, a few days after the Berlin Wall was erected, a reinforced company from the 7th Infantry Regiment (a unit of the 3rd Infantry Division) in full battle gear, was ordered to travel along the Autobahn (a major highway) from Aschaffenburg in Bavaria to West Berlin. This was to assert the right of US forces to travel unhindered from West Germany across the western part of East Germany to West Berlin. After the Berlin Wall was built, it was not known if the East German forces would attempt to impede or restrict the movement of US troops when crossing East Germany while trying to reach West Berlin. The unit arrived in West Berlin without incident confirming the right of free passage.

In November 1990, following Iraq's invasion of Kuwait, more than 6,000 3rd Infantry Division men and women deployed with the 1st Armored Division on Operation Desert Storm as part of the Allied Coalition. They participated in the Battle of Medina Ridge which was the second largest tank battle of the conflict. The 3rd Brigade was credited with the destruction of 82 tanks, 31 Armored Personnel Carriers, 11 artillery pieces, 48 trucks, 3 AAA guns and captured 72 EPW's with the loss of 2 Bradley Cavalry vehicles, 30 WIA's and 1 KIA. Later nearly 1,000 soldiers(one unit-I co. 3rd Aviation Support, 3rd ID) deployed to southeastern Turkey and northern Iraq in Operation Provide Comfort to help Kurdish refugees. In late Spring of 1991, the division supplied senior ranking officers and non-commissioned officers, along with a military police company to Task Force Victory (Forward). Stationed in Kuwait the Task Force was to provide division level support to the 11th Armored Cavalry Regiment (which shared the same duty station). Those elements of V Corps attached to the task force (including those of division) returned to their home units in early September 1991.

As part of the Army's reduction to a ten-division force, the 24th Infantry Division was inactivated on 15 February 1996, and reflagged to become the 3rd Infantry Division.

In 1996 the division was redeployed to Fort Stewart, Fort Benning, and Hunter Army Airfield, Georgia. The division repeatedly demonstrated its deployability since then by maintaining a battalion, and later a brigade task force presence in Kuwait. It has also moved sizable forces to Egypt, Bosnia and Kosovo in partnership training and peacekeeping missions.

In 1996–97, the 3rd Infantry Division Detachment, Rear Tactical Operations Center (RTOC), which is a unit manned by the Georgia Army National Guard was mobilized and served in Operation Joint Endeavor. During this time, the 3rd ID RTOC served under the 1st Infantry Division and later the 1st Armored Division. Respectively serving in Bosnia, at Camps Dallas and Angela, near Tuzla under the 1ID, and then in Croatia at Slavonski Brod, under the 1AD, serving the Assistant Division Commander for Support, then BG George Casey.

Commanders

Global War on Terrorism
Commanders
MG Buford Blount (December 2001 - September 2003)
MG William G. Webster (September 2003 - June 2006)
MG Rick Lynch (June 2006 - July 2008) 
MG Tony Cucolo (July 2008 - April 2011)
MG Robert B. Abrams (April 2011 - August 2013)
MG John M. Murray (August 2013 - August 2015)
MG James E. Rainey (August 2015 - May 2017) 
MG Leopoldo A. Quintas (May 2017 - June 2019)
MG Antonio Aguto (June 2019-June 2021)
MG Charles Costanza (June 2021 – present)

OIF I (Baghdad Spearhead)
Early in 2003 the entire division deployed in weeks to Kuwait. It was called on subsequently to spearhead Coalition forces in Operation Iraqi Freedom, fighting its way to Baghdad in early April, leading to the end of the Saddam Hussein government. The First Brigade captured the Baghdad International Airport and cleared and secured the airport, which also resulted in the division's first Medal of Honor since the Korean War, awarded to SFC Paul Ray Smith. Second Brigade, Third Infantry division made the much-publicized "Thunder Run" into downtown Baghdad. The Second Brigade was redeployed to Fallujah, Iraq during the summer of 2003. The division returned to the United States in September 2003.

Order of Battle during 2003 invasion:
1st Brigade
2nd Battalion, 7th Infantry Regiment (Mech)
3rd Battalion, 7th Infantry Regiment (Mech)
3rd Battalion, 69th Armor Regiment
1st Battalion, 41st Field Artillery Regiment (155SP)
2nd Brigade
3rd Battalion, 15th Infantry Regiment (Mech)
1st Battalion, 64th Armor Regiment
4th Battalion, 64th Armor Regiment (Tuskers)
1st Battalion, 9th Field Artillery Regiment (155SP)
3rd Brigade
203rd FSB 3rd Brigade Combat Team (Mech)
1st Battalion, 15th Infantry Regiment (Mech)
1st Battalion, 30th Infantry Regiment (Mech)
2nd Battalion, 69th Armor Regiment
1st Battalion, 10th Field Artillery Regiment (155SP)
1st Battalion, 39th Field Artillery Regiment, 3rd ID DIVARTY, MLRS - Inactivated May, 2006
3rd Squadron, 7th Cavalry Regiment
Beginning in 2004, the 3rd began re-organizing. The division shifted from three maneuver brigades to four "units of action", which are essentially smaller brigade formations, with one infantry, one armor, one cavalry, and one artillery battalion in each. The former Engineer Brigade became the 4th Brigade at Fort Stewart. Each of these units of action engaged in several mock battles at the National Training Center and Joint Readiness Training Center, and preparation for a second deployment to Iraq.

OIF III

In January 2005, the Third Infantry Division became the first Army division to serve a second tour in Iraq. The division headquarters took control of the Multi-National Division Baghdad, MND-B, headquartered at Camp Liberty and with responsibility for the greater Baghdad area. First and Third Brigades of the Third Infantry Division were placed under control of the 42nd Infantry Division, and later under the 101st Airborne Division, in MND-North. In preparation of this deployment a Fourth Brigade was organized and became the first cohesive brigade combat team sent into a combat zone by the US Army, cohesive in that it fulfilled the table of organization requirement of such a unit. The California Army National Guard's 1st Battalion 184th Infantry Regiment served as one of the brigade's two infantry battalions, as well as the detachment from the Hawaii Army National Guard's 29th Brigade Combat Team, the 2/299th Infantry, also the 48th Brigade Combat Team from the Georgia Army National Guard, 2/130 Infantry Battalion of the Illinois National Guard, and Charlie Company, 1st Battalion, 295th Infantry Battalion from the Puerto Rico Army National Guard served in this Operation.

2/69 Armor was assigned to Camp War Horse in Iraq. By Mid 2005 Primary elements of 2/69 Armor 3rd Brigade 3rd Infantry Division was re-deployed to Ramadi Iraq, replacing elements of the 2nd ID. They ran joint missions with 2nd Mar Div. and elements of the Pennsylvania National Guard and the 2/130th Infantry of the Illinois National Guard who was redeployed as to Al Taquattum as the infantry battalion.

OIF V
The division redeployed to Fort Stewart and Fort Benning in January 2006. On 17 November 2006, the Army announced that the Third Infantry Division is scheduled to return to Iraq in 2007 and thus become the first Army division to serve three tours in Iraq. The division headquarters became the leadership organization of MND-C (Multi-National Division Central), a new command established south of Baghdad as part of the Iraq War troop surge of 2007.

In support of operations in Baghdad, the unit 3rd Squadron, 7th Cavalry was detached from 3ID and assigned by General Petraeus to 3rd BCT, 82nd Airborne who was under the command of the 1st Cavalry Division. In 2008, 82nd Airborne and 1st CAV redeployed home, and 3–7 CAV was handed over to 3rd BCT, 4th Infantry Division under the command of the 25th Infantry Division. They would remain under this command until 3–7 CAV's redeployment back to Fort Stewart, being reattached to the 3rd Infantry Division. Similarly, 1st Battalion, 64th Armor was detached from 3ID and attached to 2nd BCT, 1st Infantry Division under 1st Cavalry Division, and later under 2nd BCT, 101st Infantry Division under command of 4th Infantry Division.

Reassignment of 1st Brigade
In the fall of 2008, the 3rd Infantry Division's 1st Brigade was assigned to serve as the on-call federal response force under the control of NORTHCOM, the combatant command assigned responsibility for the continental United States. The brigade remained at its home station of Fort Stewart, Georgia, and "is training to deploy domestically in response to terrorist attacks or other national emergencies." The brigade will be trained in responding to WMD attacks, crowd control, and dealing with civil unrest.

The force was renamed "Chemical, biological, radiological, nuclear, or high-yield explosive Consequence Management Response Force". Its acronym, CCMRF, is pronounced "see-smurf", and the unit is now under the daily control of United States Northern Command's Army North, whose mission is to "protect the United States homeland and support local, state, and federal authorities." The unit is a multi-branch force with servicemembers from the four branches of the United States Department of Defense.

Reorganization of 4th Brigade
In March 2009, 4th Brigade reorganized from a mechanized or heavy brigade to a light infantry brigade. As part of this reorganization, 4th Battalion, 64th Armor was reflagged as 3rd Battalion, 15th Infantry Regiment.

OIF VII

The 3rd Infantry Division assumed command of the Multi-National Division-North, now United States Division-North, in October 2009. This milestone marked the division's fourth tour in support of Operation Iraqi Freedom (I, III, V, and VII). The division has elements operating in every area of Iraq as the mission changes from Operation Iraqi Freedom to Operation New Dawn on 1 September 2010. With the advent of Operation New Dawn, the focus will shift from combat operations to stability and advise and assist operations throughout all Iraq's provinces.

In the course of Operation Iraqi Freedom up until 24 September 2010, 436 members of the division were killed in action

Operation Enduring Freedom

The Combat Aviation Brigade, 3rd Infantry Division deployed to Afghanistan for a 13-month tour. The brigade was the first unit from 3ID to deploy to Afghanistan. During that tour 3rd CAB soldiers flew about 26,000 missions, including 800 air assaults, and were responsible for about 2,500 enemy casualties.

3rd CAB is slated to deploy to Afghanistan again in January 2013. The 2500 soldiers will deploy with 3rd Special Troops Battalion for a 9-month tour. The Marne Air will be operating out of Kandahar Airfield in the RC-South area-of-operations, relieving the 25th CAB.

Both the 3rd CAB and 3rd STB will fall under their parent division when the 3ID Headquarters and Headquarters Battalion deploys in August and takes over command of RC-South from 82nd Airborne Division HQ.

The 2nd Heavy BCT's two combined-arms battalions also deployed individually to Afghanistan. 1st Battalion, 64th Armor Regiment deployed in March 2012. They are attached to the 3rd Stryker Brigade, 2nd Infantry Division (United States) from Joint Base Lewis-McChord, WA, to help train Afghanistan National Security Forces to take over in their country's security operations. 1st Battalion, 30th Infantry Regiment deployed a month earlier. They are tasked with providing security to units conducting contingency operations. Both battalions will serve nine-month tour.

In December 2012, the 3rd Sustainment Brigade deployed for its fifth deployment over the last decade and first to Afghanistan, for nine months in support of Operation Enduring Freedom 12–13, let by COL Ron Novack and CSM Daniels. Deployed to Kandahar with 276 soldiers the brigade provided sustainment and retrograde support to the 3rd and 4th Infantry Divisions, 1st and 2nd Marine Expeditionary Forces, and International Security Assistance Forces operating in Regional Commands South, Southwest, and National Support Element-West. The brigade assisted in the closure and transfer of over 61 Forward Operating Bases while simultaneously providing sustainment to the force. Additionally, the 3rd Sustainment Brigade provided direct support to the 1st and 2nd Brigade Combat Teams and the Combat Aviation Brigade of the 3rd Infantry Division.

In February 2013, the 4th Infantry Brigade Combat Team, 3rd Infantry Division (later reflagged as the 2nd Infantry Brigade Combat Team, 3rd Infantry Division), deployed to Logar Province and Wardak Province, Afghanistan in support of Operation Enduring Freedom. 6th Squadron, 8th Cavalry Regiment was tasked with securing Logar Province, and disrupting the almost daily rocket attacks on Forward Operation Base Shank. 3rd Battalion, 15th Infantry Regiment was tasked with securing Wardak Province's highly volatile Highway 1. The soldiers of 4th Infantry Brigade Combat Team, 3rd Infantry Division returned home in late November 2013 after serving a 9-month tour.

Operation Freedom's Sentinel
In April 2017, Military.com reported that about 200 soldiers from the 3rd Infantry Division Headquarters will deploy to Afghanistan to replace the 1st Cavalry Division Headquarters at Bagram Airfield taking over command of the U.S. Forces-Afghanistan's National Support Element, as part of Operation Freedom's Sentinel.

Starting in December 2018 troops of the Georgia Army National Guard's 48th IBCT of the 3rd Infantry Division were deployed in support of NATO operations in Afghanistan. These missions included train, advise, assist missions for the Afghanistan military as well as attached infantry units from 3rd Battalion, 121st Infantry Regiment to Army Special Forces ODAs and other Special Operations forces.

Operation Atlantic Resolve
In February 2015, ArmyTimes reported that More than 3,000 soldiers from the 1st Heavy Brigade Combat Team, 3rd Combat Aviation Brigade, 3rd ID's Artillery and other units of the 3rd Infantry Division began an accumulative of 12 months deployment to Europe in March 2015 in support of Operation Atlantic Resolve. Soldiers from 3rd ID deployed to various European countries including Germany, Estonia, Latvia, Lithuania, Poland, Romania and Bulgaria with the 1st Brigade acting as the European Rotational Force and NATO Response Force, which works and trains with NATO allies to remain prepared for contingency operations within the European Command's area of responsibility.

Current structure

3rd Infantry Division consists of a division headquarters battalion, two armored brigade combat teams, an associated brigade combat team, a task force unit with the 1st Battalion, 28th Infantry Regiment, a division artillery, a sustainment brigade, and a combat aviation brigade along with a maneuver enhancement brigade.  All BCTs are headquartered at Fort Stewart except for the 48th IBCT which is headquartered in Macon, Georgia and Task Force 1-28th Infantry, which is located at Fort Benning. All field artillery battalions remain connected to their brigade combat teams.

 3rd Infantry Division
 Headquarters and Headquarters Battalion
1st Armored Brigade Combat Team (ABCT), 3rd Infantry Division "Raider" – regionally allocated to Europe
Headquarters and Headquarters Company (HHC), 1st BCT
 5th Squadron, 7th Cavalry Regiment–Reconnaissance, Surveillance, and Target Acquisition (RSTA) "Warpaint"
 1st Battalion, 64th Armor Regiment "Desert Rogue"
 3rd Battalion, 69th Armor Regiment "Speed & Power"
 2nd Battalion, 7th Infantry Regiment "Cottonbalers"
 1st Battalion, 41st Field Artillery Regiment (FAR) "Glory's Guns"
 10th Brigade Engineer Battalion (BEB) "Bridge the Sky"
 3rd Brigade Support Battalion (BSB) "Ready to Roll"
2nd Armored Brigade Combat Team "Spartans"
HHC, 2nd BCT
 6th Squadron, 8th Cavalry Regiment "Mustang"
 3rd Battalion, 67th Armor Regiment ”Hounds of Hell"
 3rd Battalion, 15th Infantry Regiment "Old China Hands"
 2nd Battalion, 69th Armor Regiment "Panthers" 
 1st Battalion, 9th Field Artillery Regiment "Battlekings"
 9th BEB "Gila"
 703rd BSB "Maintain"
48th Infantry Brigade Combat Team (Georgia Army National Guard), 3rd Infantry Division (associated unit) "Macon Volunteers"
 HHC, 48th IBCT (Macon, Georgia)
 1st Squadron, 108th Cavalry Regiment (Calhoun, Georgia)  "Roughriders"
 1st Battalion, 121st Infantry Regiment (Winder, Georgia) "Slayers"
 2nd Battalion, 121st Infantry Regiment (Forsyth, Georgia) "Warriors"
 3rd Battalion, 121st Infantry Regiment (Cumming, Georgia) "Pathfinders"
 1st Battalion, 118th FAR (Savannah, Georgia) "Hickory's Howitzer's"
 148th BSB (Macon, Georgia) "Wishmasters"
 177th BEB (Statesboro, Georgia)
 Task Force 1st Battalion, 28th Infantry Regiment (Fort Benning, Georgia)
3rd Infantry Division Artillery (DIVARTY) "Marne Thunder" has training and readiness oversight of field artillery battalions, which remain organic to their brigade combat teams.
 Headquarters and Headquarters Battery, DIVARTY
Combat Aviation Brigade (CAB) "Falcon"
 HHC, CAB "Talons"
 2nd Battalion (General Support), 3rd Aviation Regiment (UH-60A/UH-60L/CH-47) "Knighthawk"
 4th Battalion (Assault), 3rd Aviation Regiment (UH-60M) "Brawler"
 3rd Squadron, 17th Cavalry Regiment (AH-64D/AH-64DW) "Lighthorse"
 603rd Aviation Support Battalion "Work Horse"
3rd Infantry Division Sustainment Brigade
 HHC, 3rd Infantry Division Sustainment Brigade
 Special Troops Battalion
 87th Combat Sustainment Support Battalion
 648th Maneuver Enhancement Brigade

The 2nd Brigade Combat Team inactivated on 15 January 2015 as part of the Army's modular brigade reorganization. Special Troops Battalion; 3rd Squadron, 7th Cavalry Regiment; 1st Battalion, 9th Field Artillery Regiment; and 26th Brigade Support Battalion were inactivated concurrently, with some of their companies joining other brigades' battalions. The maneuver battalions of 2nd Brigade Combat Team moved to other brigades in the division: 1st Battalion, 64th Armor Regiment moved to 1st Brigade Combat Team and 1st Battalion, 30th Infantry Regiment moved to 4th Brigade Combat Team. With the inactivation of 2nd Brigade Combat Team, 4th Brigade Combat Team was reflagged as the 2nd Brigade Combat Team. After the reorganization, the division had three BCTs, each with three maneuver battalions.

The 42nd Fires Brigade was activated at Fort Stewart on 17 October 2013 and later reflagged as 3rd Infantry Division Artillery. Division Artillery has training oversight of the division's artillery battalions, although the battalions remain organic to their respective BCTs.

As part of budget driven downsizing, the Army announced that it would inactivate the 3rd Brigade Combat Team by the end of 2015 and replace it with a Battalion Task Force centered around the 1st Battalion, 28th Infantry. The 3rd Brigade Combat Team inactivated on 15 December 2015.

Lineage and honors

Division
Constituted 12 November 1917 in the Regular Army as Headquarters, 3d Division
Organized 21 November 1917 at Camp Greene, North Carolina
Redesignated 1 August 1942 as Headquarters, 3d Infantry Division
Reorganized and redesignated 1 April 1960 as Headquarters and Headquarters Company, 3d Infantry Division
Reorganized and redesignated 16 May 2004 as Headquarters and Tactical Command Posts, 3d Infantry Division
Reorganized and redesignated 16 November 2010 as Headquarters and Headquarters Battalion, 3d Infantry Division

Campaign participation credit

Decorations

Division Artillery
Constituted 12 November 1917 in the Regular Army as Headquarters, 3rd Field Artillery Brigade, and assigned to the 3rd Division
Organized 26 November 1917 at Camp Stanley, Texas
Disbanded 16 October 1939 at Fort Lewis, Washington
Reconstituted 1 October 1940 in the Regular Army as Headquarters and Headquarters Battery, 3rd Division Artillery, and activated at Fort Lewis, Washington
Redesignated 1 July 1957 as Headquarters and Headquarters Battery, 3rd Infantry Division Artillery

Campaign participation credit

Decorations

Combat Aviation Brigade
Constituted 16 March 1985 in the Regular Army as Headquarters and Headquarters Company, Aviation Brigade, 3rd Infantry Division, and activated in Germany.

Deployed to Afghanistan in November 2009 and returned home in November 2010.

Division Band
Constituted 20 August 1943 in the Regular Army as the Band, 3rd Infantry Division
Redesignated 1 December 1943 as the 3d Infantry Division Band and activated in North Africa
Consolidated 20 March 1963 with Headquarters and Headquarters Detachment, 3rd Infantry Division Trains, and consolidated unit reorganized and redesignated as Headquarters, Headquarters and Band, 3rd Infantry Division Support Command.
Reorganized and redesignated 15 March 1968 as Headquarters, Headquarters Company and Band, 3rd Infantry Division Support Command.
Band element withdrawn 21 May 1972 from Headquarters, Headquarters Company and Band, 3rd Infantry Division Support Command, and absorbed by the 3d Adjutant General Company
Band element withdrawn 1 October 1984 from the 3d Adjutant General Company and redesignated as the 3rd Infantry Division Band.

Campaign participation credit
 World War I
Aisne
Champagne-Marne
Aisne-Marne
Saint-Mihiel
Meuse-Argonne
Champagne 1918

 World War II – EAME
Algeria-French Morocco (with arrowhead)
Tunisia
Sicily (with arrowhead)
Naples-Foggia
Anzio (with arrowhead)
Rome-Arno
Southern France (with arrowhead)
Rhineland
Ardennes-Alsace
Central Europe

 Korean War
Chinese Communist Forces Intervention
First United Nations Counteroffensive
Chinese Communist Forces Spring Offensive
United Nations Summer-Fall Offensive
Second Korean Winter
Korea, Summer-Fall 1952
Third Korean Winter
Korea, Summer 1953

 War on Terror
Liberation of Iraq
Transition of Iraq
Iraqi Governance
National Resolution
Iraqi Surge
Iraqi Sovereignty
New Dawn

Decorations

Notable members

Division Song 
Dogface Soldier

See also
92nd Engineer Battalion
256th Infantry Brigade – US Army unit attached to 3rd ID in OIF III.
Baker Boys: Inside the Surge – 2010 documentary about a company in 3rd ID.
Dogface – term referring to soldiers of the 3rd ID.
Heavy Metal: a Tank Company's Battle to Baghdad – 2005 book co-written by former 3rd ID company commander.
Over There – 2005 fictional television series about a 3rd ID unit.
To Hell and Back – 1955 film based on Audie Murphy's 1949 autobiographical novel.

References

Bibliography

American Battle Monuments Commission. American Armies and Battlefields in Europe. Washington: Government Printing Office, 1938. Reprint. Washington: Government Printing Office, 1992.
American Battle Monuments Commission. 3d Division Summary of Operations in the World War. Washington: Government Printing Office, 1944.
Appleman, Roy E. South to the Naktong, North to the Yalu, June–November 1950. United States Army in the Korean War. Washington: Government Printing Office, 1961, 1986.

Blumenson, Martin. Salerno to Cassino. United States Army in World War II. Washington: Government Printing Office, 1969, 1988.
Cairns, Bogardus S. "The Breakout at Anzio: A Lesson in Tank-Infantry Cooperation." Military Review 28 (January 1949):23–32.
Clarke, Jeffrey J., and Smith, Robert Ross. Riviera to the Rhine. United States Army in World War II. Washington: Government Printing Office, 1993.
Crawford, Charles. Six Months with the 6th Brigade. Kansas City: E. B. Barnett, 1928.
Dickman, Joseph T. The Great Crusade: A Narrative of the World War. New York: D. Appleton and Co., 1927.
Dolcater, Max W., ed. 3rd Infantry Division in Korea. Tokyo: Toppan Printing Co., 1953.
"A Fiftieth for the Marne Division." Army Digest 22 (November 1967):22.
Fisher, Ernest F., Jr. Cassino to the Alps. United States Army in World War II. Washington: Government Printing Office, 1977, 1989.
Garland, Albert N., and Smyth, Howard McGaw. Sicily and the Surrender of Italy. United States Army in World War II. Washington: Government Printing Office, 1965. 1991.
Gaul, Jeffrey. History of the Third Infantry Division: Rock of the Marne. Paducah, Kentucky: Turner Publishing, 1988.
Golden, Joe E. "Third U.S. Infantry Division in Italy." Military Review 24 (June 1944):5–10.
Hemenway, Frederick Vinton, ed. and comp. History of the Third Division, United States Army in the World War, For the period 1 December 1917 to 1 January 1919. Cologne, Germany: M. DuMont Schauberg, 1919.
Hermes, Walter G. Truce Tent and Fighting Front. United States Army in the Korean War. Washington: Government Printing Office, 1966, 1988.
Historical Division, Department of the Army. Anzio Beachhead (22 January-25 May 1944). American Forces in Action. Washington: Government Printing Office, 1948, 1990.
Historical Section, Army War College. Order of Battle of the United States Land Forces in the World War: American Expeditionary Forces: Divisions. Washington: Government Printing Office, 1931. Reprint. Washington: Government Printing Office, 1988.
History of the Third Division, United States Army in the World War for the Period 1 December 1917 to 1 January 1919. Cologne, Germany: M. DuSchaubery, 1919.
Holmes, Howard W. "100 Miles to Nijmegen." Army Digest 22 (January 1967):29–30.
Howe, George F. Northwest Africa: Seizing the Initiative in the West. United States Army in World War II. Washington: Government Printing Office, 1957, 1991.
Jacobs, Bruce. Soldiers: The Fighting Divisions of the Regular Army. New York: W. W. Norton and Co., 1958.
Kahn, E. J., Jr., and McLemore, H. Fighting Divisions. Washington: Infantry Journal Press, 1945. Reprint. Washington: Zenger Publishing Co., 1980.
Kittler, Glenn D. "From Chateau-Thierry to Anzio to Wonson; The Fighting Third." SAGA: True Adventures for Men 8 (September 1954):10-13ff.
Lacey, Jim. The Third Infantry Division's Twenty-One Day Assault on Baghdad. US Naval Institute Press: 2007.
Lamb, David S. Till We Meet Again. Cleveland: Stevens Publishing Co., 1944.
Le Mon, Warren. "The Marne Division." Army Information Digest 20 (October 1965):37–43.
MacDonald, Charles B. The Last Offensive. United States Army in World War II. Washington: Government Printing Office, 1973, 1990.
Military Intelligence Division, War Department. From the Volturno to the Winter Line (6 October-15 November 1943). American Forces in Action. Washington: Government Printing Office, 1945, 1990.
Military Intelligence Division, War Department. Salerno: American Operations from the Beaches to the Volturno (9 September-6 October 1943). Washington: Government Printing Office, 1944, 1990.
Mohr, G. William. Third Infantry Division, WWII, The Victory Path Thru France and Germany. Kokomo, Ind. O & M, 1985.
Murphy, Audie. To Hell and Back. New York: Henry Holt and Co., 1949.
"Pass in Review." Army Information Digest 20 (October 1965):32–36.
Pass in Review, The Pictorial History of the Third Division, United States Army, Operations, Training, Maneuvers, Camp Ord, California, 1940. Baton Rouge: Army and Navy Publishing Co., 1940.
Personnel Service Division, Adjutant General Section. 3d Infantry Division. Administrative Service Branch, Adjutant General Section, 1971.
Rescigno, Richard J., and Wiltamuth, Richard L. "Alert!--That's the Watchword of the Marne Division Today." Army Digest 25 (August 1970):38–43.
Road to Rome. n.p., 1945.
Rosson, William B. "Operational Highlights of the 3d Infantry Division." Military Review 25 (December 1945):42–45.
Rosson, William B. "3d Infantry Division Crosses the Meurthe." Military Review 26 (February 1947):24–35.
Scott, Hugh A. The Blue and White Devils. A Personal Memoir and History of the 3rd Infantry Division in World War II. Nashville, Tenn., Battery Press, 1984.
Stitt, Edgar A. 100 Days, 100-Hours: "Phantom" Brigade in the Gulf War. Hong Kong: Concord Publications, 1991.
Small, Collie. "The Third: Tops in Honors." Saturday Evening Post 218 (11 August 1945):28-29ff.
Stanton, Shelby, World War II Order of Battle: An Encyclopedic Reference to U.S. Army Ground Forces from Battalion through Division, 1939-1946 (Revised Edition, 2006), Stackpole Books 
Taggart, Donald G., ed. History of the Third Infantry Division in World War II. Washington: Infantry Journal Press, 1947. Reprint. Nashville, Tenn., Battery Press, 1987.
Taylor, Horace G.; Milam, Michael M.; and Ericksen, Scott R. "3d Infantry Division." Infantry 68 (January–February 1978):18–22.
The Third Division at Chateau Thierry. U.S. Army Chemical Corps Historical Studies, Gas Warfare in World War I, Study No. 14. Washington: U.S. Army Chemical Corps Historical Office, 1959.
Third Division Citations. Andernach on the Rhine, Germany: Carl Reinartz, 1919.
"3rd Infantry Division Gyroscoping: Enlistments Open." Recruiting Journal 10 (May 1957):8–9.
3rd Infantry Division in Korea. Society of the Third Infantry Division, 1987.
3rd Infantry Division, Information Office. 3d Infantry Division, 1917-Forty Year Odyssey-1958. Würzburg, Germany: Konrad Triltsch, 1958.
"Valor: 3d Division in Sicily." Infantry Journal 54 (March 1944):16–18; (June 1944): 44.
Westover, John G. Combat Support in Korea. Washington: Combat Forces Press, 1955. Reprint. Washington: Government Printing Office, 1990.

External links

3rd Infantry Division Home Page – official site.
Society of the 3d Infantry Division
Photographic Journey: Anzio to Austria
Sgt. William Heller's World War II Memoirs-3rd Infantry Division
GlobalSecurity.org: 3d Infantry Division

003d Infantry Division, U.S.
Military units and formations established in 1917
Infantry Division, U.S. 003d
03
USInfDiv0003
Infantry divisions of the United States Army in World War II